Elbert Proverbs (born 1 July 1957) is a Barbadian cricketer. He played in one first-class and one List A match for the Barbados cricket team in 1982/83 and 1984/85.

See also
 List of Barbadian representative cricketers

References

External links
 

1957 births
Living people
Barbadian cricketers
Barbados cricketers
People from Saint Philip, Barbados